Kenneth N. Browne (June 25, 1923 – February 22, 2000) was an American politician who served in the New York State Assembly from 1965 to 1968.

He died of prostate cancer on February 22, 2000, in Queens, New York City, New York at age 76.

References

1923 births
2000 deaths
Democratic Party members of the New York State Assembly
20th-century American politicians